Master of Brutality is the debut studio album by the Japanese doom metal band Church of Misery, released in 2001 by Southern Lord Records.

Five of the six tracks were based on and titled after infamous serial killers Edmund Kemper, Peter Sutcliffe, Herbert Mullin and John Wayne Gacy (portrayed on the cover). The instrumental track "Green River" was inspired by serial killer Gary Ridgway. The first track, "Killifornia", contains samples of Kemper speaking. The artwork and booklet features pictures and sketches of Gacy; the back art depicts Gacy dressed as "Pogo the Clown".

The album also contains a cover of "Cities on Flame with Rock and Roll" by Blue Öyster Cult.

Track listing

Personnel
Church of Misery
 Yoshiaki Negishi – vocals
 Tomohiro Nishmura – guitar
 Tatsu Mikami – bass
 Junji Narita – drums

References

2001 debut albums
Church of Misery albums
Southern Lord Records albums